William Tho... (fl. 1394) was an English politician.

This politician remains obscure to us, and even his full surname is unknown. His name does not match that of a burgess of Reading, Berkshire, so he has not been clearly identified.

He was a Member (MP) of the Parliament of England for Reading in 1394.

References

Year of birth missing
Year of death missing
English MPs 1394